Achy is a village in the Jalal-Abad Region of Kyrgyzstan. It is part of the Suzak District. Its population was 520 in 2021.

References
 

Populated places in Jalal-Abad Region